Maze National Park is a national park in the Southern Nations, Nationalities, and People's Region of Ethiopia. It is 210 square kilometers in size located 460 km southwest of Addis Ababa. Elevations within the park range between 1000 and 1200 meters above sea level. Maze was founded in 2005, and is managed by the Ethiopian Wildlife Conservation Authority.

Wildlife

Fauna
Maze National Park is home to 37 species of mammals and 196 species of birds. The park is noted for its population of the endangered Swayne's hartebeest (Alcelaphus buselaphus swaynei), and is said to be second only to Senkelle Swayne's Hartebeest Sanctuary in importance for that subspecies. Other animals who are common here are African buffalos, Anubis baboons, Lions, Leopards, Vervet monkeys, oribis, Bohor reedbucks, waterbucks, bushbucks, Lesser kudus, Greater kudus, wheetahs, warthogs, servals, and Bushpigs.

References

External links
 
 Description at the SNNPR Bureau of Culture and Tourism

National parks of Ethiopia
Protected areas established in 2005
2005 establishments in Ethiopia
Protected areas of Southern Nations, Nationalities, and Peoples' Region